Jefferson City School District is a school district based in Jefferson City, Missouri (USA).

Location
The district covers northern portions of Cole County as well as southern portions of Callaway County.

Schools

High schools
Jefferson City High School (09-12) - Jefferson City
Capital City High School (09-12) - Jefferson City

Middle schools
Lewis and Clark Middle School (06-08) - Jefferson City
Thomas Jefferson Middle School (06-08) - Jefferson City

Elementary schools
Belair Elementary School (K-05) - Jefferson City
Callaway Hills Elementary School (K-05) - Holts Summit
Cedar Hill Elementary School (K-05) - Jefferson City
East Elementary School (K-05) - Jefferson City
Lawson Elementary School (K-05) - Jefferson City
Moreau Heights Elementary School (K-05) - Jefferson City
North Elementary School (K-05) - Holts Summit
Pioneer Trail Elementary (K-05) - Jefferson City
South Elementary School (K-05) - Jefferson City
Southwest Early Childhood Education Center (PK) - Jefferson City
Thorpe Gordon Elementary School (K-05) - Jefferson City
West Elementary School (K-05) - Jefferson City

Other Facilities
Jefferson City Academic Center - Jefferson City
Nichols Career Center - Jefferson City
Etta & Joseph Miller Performing Arts Center - Jefferson City
Dix Road Educational Center
Mid-Missouri Adult Learning Center
Jefferson City district learning center

Demographics
There were a total of 8,268 students enrolled in the Jefferson City Public School District during the 2006 school year. The racial makeup of the district was 77.1% White, 18.6% African American, 2.6% Hispanic, 1.4% Asian, and 0.3% Native American.

See also
List of school districts in Missouri

References

External links
Jefferson City Public Schools – Official site.
Jefferson City School District Profile – Missouri Dept. of Elementary & Secondary Education.
Etta & Joseph Miller Performing Arts Center - District performing arts facility

School districts in Missouri
Jefferson City, Missouri
Education in Cole County, Missouri
Education in Callaway County, Missouri